Rote Bergsteiger ("Red Mountaineers") is an East German television series.

See also
List of German television series

External links
 

Television series set in the 1930s
1968 German television series debuts
1968 German television series endings
German-language television shows
Television in East Germany